The 1997–98 season was Galatasaray's 94th in existence and its 40th consecutive season in the 1. Lig. This article shows statistics of the club's players in the season, and also lists all matches that the club have played in the season.

Squad statistics

Players in / out

In

Out

1. Lig

Standings

Matches

Türkiye Kupası
Kick-off listed in local time (EET)

Sixth round

Quarter-final

Semi-final

Final

UEFA Champions League

Second qualifying round

Group stage

Süper Kupa-Cumhurbaşkanlığı Kupası
Kick-off listed in local time (EET)

Friendly matches
Kick-off listed in local time (EET)

TSYD Kupası

Attendance

References

 Tuncay, Bülent (2002). Galatasaray Tarihi. Yapı Kredi Yayınları

External links
 Galatasaray Sports Club Official Website 
 Turkish Football Federation – Galatasaray A.Ş. 
 uefa.com – Galatasaray AŞ

Galatasaray S.K. (football) seasons
Turkish football clubs 1997–98 season
Turkish football championship-winning seasons
1990s in Istanbul
Galatasaray Sports Club 1997–98 season